is a Japanese manga written and illustrated by Tsuta Suzuki. The manga was published by Libre Publishing. It is licensed in North America by Digital Manga Publishing, which released the first volume through its imprint, Juné, on May 27, 2008, the second volume following on August 19, 2009.  It is about a man who is sick with a disease cursed to affect all of his bloodline who summons a therianthrope, his family's guardian, to heal him.

Reception
Holly Ellingwood of ActiveAnime praised the 'quite striking' design of the therianthrope, and enjoyed his background story in the second volume.  Michelle Smith found the background story incongruous with the otherwise "crude" presentation of the therianthrope in the rest of the series. Leroy Douresseaux praises the "slow burn", the "anticipation of consummation" in the work, and compares the story to Danielle Steel's fiction. Danielle van Gorder praised the character development, especially of the secondary characters, and the manga artist's easily distinguishable character designs. Van Gorder found the second volume "a bit disjointed", as it jumps around in time, showing the progress of the characters' relationship.

References

External links

2006 manga
Digital Manga Publishing titles
Manga anthologies
Supernatural anime and manga
Yaoi anime and manga